Phacelia cronquistiana (Cronquist's phacelia) is a plant species native to Utah and Arizona, known only from Kane and Mohave Counties.

Leaf blades are 3–7 mm long and 2–6 mm wide. Flowers are up to 4 mm long, pale purple with a white center.

References

cronquistiana
Endemic flora of California
Flora without expected TNC conservation status